Luke of Simferopol (Luke, born Valentin Felixovich Voyno-Yasenetsky, ; April 27 or May 9, 1877 in Kerch – June 11, 1961, Simferopol), known as Saint Luke the Blessed Surgeon, was an outstanding surgeon, the founder of purulent surgery, a spiritual writer, a bishop of the Russian Orthodox Church, and archbishop of Simferopol and the Crimea from May 1946. He was a laureate of the Stalin Prize in medicine in 1946.

His most important work in medicine is Sketches of Purulent Surgery (1934). This is still a reference book and a manual for surgeons. 
Also, he operated patients who had diseases with gall bladder, stomach and with other organs of abdominal cavity and worked in neurosurgery and orthopedics.
Voyno-Yasenetsky made a great contribution into anesthesiology. His first monography “Regional anesthesiology” was published in 1915 in Petrograd. 
In 1916 he defended a thesis “About regional anesthesiology of the second branch of trigeminal nerve” 
He wrote about practical importance of method of regional anesthesia in the attachment to the “Essays of purulent surgery”

“... a great amount of death is due to unskillful or careless use of chloroform and ether. [...] That’s why these methods of local anaesthesia which help doctors pay attention only for the operation have a great importance. In my opinion, one of the most important conditions in the development of the rural surgery is the wide familiarisation of doctors with these methods...”

Voyno-Yasenetsky was the first who described the anaesthesia for the trigeminal nerve by the use of ethanol into the branches of this nerve (orbital, maxillary and mandibular) and into gassers node.

He showed 4 reports in the first scientific meeting of the doctors in the Turkestan (23-28 October 1922). There were conclusions about surgery treatment of tuberculosis, purulent processes of knee joint, tendon of hands and ribs cartilages. 
Voyno-Yasenetsky made an experiment with the bacteriologist Guselnikov where they were studying the mechanism of the purulent processes in the ribs cartilage after typhus.
When he was working in the military hospital in the Krasnoyarsk he invented new operations, such as joints rejection. This operation was used to treat osteomyelitis of big joints.

As a noticeable religious figure, he was subjected to political repressions and spent 11 years in internal exile.
Luke's mother was Orthodox and his father was Catholic, and according to his memoirs, he did not receive a religious upbringing from his family. When he left school the principal gave him a copy of the New Testament, and it was by a careful study of this that he came to know the teachings of Christ.

In 1958, writing after Stalin's death, and under Nikita Khrushchev's new wave of anti-religious persecution, Saint Luke stated "how arduous it has been to swim against the stormy current of antireligious propaganda, and how many sufferings it caused me, and continues to cause me to this day."

Glorification 
He was canonized by the Russian Orthodox Church on May 25, 1996. His feast day is May 29/June 11 (Julian [Old] Calendar/Revised Julian [New] Calendar).
On March 17, 1996, Luke's remains were disinterred, with many thousands of people attending the ceremony. It is said that an indescribable aroma arose from his relics, while his heart was discovered incorrupt , a testament to the great love he bore towards Christ and his fellow men. Three days later on March 20, 1996, his relics were transferred to the Church of the Holy Trinity.

His relics are in the cathedral of the Holy Trinity in Simferopol. He is beloved and celebrated worldwide. In Greece portions of the relics of Saint Luke are found in Sagmata monastery, Dovra monastery and a few other churches.

Gallery

See also 
 Confessor of the Faith
 Pyogenic infection
 Unmercenary Physicians

Sources 
Archdeacon Vasiliy Marushchak, The Blessed Surgeon: The Life of Saint Luke of Simferopol, Divine Ascent Press,  2002
Archmandrite Nektarios Antonopoulos, Saint Luke of Simferopol and Crimea I Embraced Martyrdom: An Autobiography, Porphyra Publications, 2013 (in Greek)

References

External links 
 

1877 births
1961 deaths
People from Kerch
People from Taurida Governorate
People from Simferopol
20th-century Christian saints
Converts to Eastern Orthodoxy
Russian saints of the Eastern Orthodox Church
Holy Unmercenaries
Miracle workers
20th-century Eastern Orthodox bishops
Bishops of the Russian Orthodox Church
Surgeons from the Russian Empire
Inventors from the Russian Empire
Stalin Prize winners
Soviet surgeons